Ireland–Palestine relations are the bilateral and historical relations between the Republic of Ireland and the State of Palestine. In 2000, Ireland established a representative office in Ramallah and Palestine has a representative office in Dublin. Both countries are members of the Union for the Mediterranean.

History 
By the late 1960s, Ireland was increasingly concerned about the fate of Palestinian refugees who fled the Six-Day War in 1967. In 1969, Irish Foreign Minister Frank Aiken described the problem as the "main and most pressing objective" of Ireland's Middle East policy.

In 1980, Ireland was the first European Union member state to endorse the establishment of a Palestinian state.

In January 2011, Ireland accorded the Palestinian delegation in Dublin diplomatic status. A few months later, their Foreign Affairs Minister stated that Ireland would "lead the charge" in recognizing Palestinian statehood, but that it would not come until the PNA was in full and sole control over its territories. In October 2014, the Upper House of the Irish Parliament unanimously passed a motion calling on the Government to recognize the State of Palestine. In December 2014, the Lower House of Ireland's Parliament followed suit.

Despite strong support for Palestine in Ireland, the government has yet to implement the 2014 decision to formalise diplomatic relations between the two, although Foreign Minister Simon Coveney had previously indicated this could change. Although both houses of the Irish parliament passed the motion to recognise the state of Palestine, the Government wishes to do this as part of a wider EU move, which has been criticised by Irish TDs. As of 2022, Ireland does not recognise the state of Palestine.

See also 

 Foreign relations of Ireland
 Foreign relations of Palestine

References

 
Palestine
Bilateral relations of the State of Palestine